Bare Rock is a rock which lies  northeast of Berntsen Point in the entrance to Borge Bay, off the west side of Signy Island in the South Orkney Islands rising to an elevation of . It was charted and named descriptively by Discovery Investigations personnel on the RRS Discovery in 1927.

References 

Rock formations of the South Orkney Islands